Loveman is a surname. Notable people with the surname include:

Gary Loveman (born 1960), American chief executive
Robert Loveman (1864–1923), American poet
Samuel Loveman (1887–1976), American poet, critic, and dramatist

See also
David Bernard Loveman Noa (1878–1901), United States Navy officer
Loveman's (disambiguation), multiple American department store chains